Gillian Dorothy Kennedy   is a Consultant speech and language therapist specialising in neonates and paediatrics at University College Hospital.

Career
Kennedy undertook undergraduate study at the University of Edinburgh and a MSc at City, University of London. She is a Consultant speech and language therapist at University College Hospital, and one of two national trainers in NIDCAP (Newborn Individualised Developmental Care and Assessment Program). She teaches families and healthcare staff to recognise the importance of non-verbal communication in infants and is a national and international adviser and educator in the field.

She was elected a Fellow of the Royal College of Speech and Language Therapists in 2015 and was appointed an OBE in the 2015 Birthday Honours for services to speech therapy.

References

British women academics
Speech and language pathologists
Members of the Order of the British Empire
Fellows of the Royal College of Speech and Language Therapists